Autonav can refer to :

 the NASA autonomous spacecraft navigation software, e.g. as used on Deep Space 1 spacecraft.
 the autonomous rover navigation/driving software used on the NASA Curiosity Mars rover (Mars Science Laboratory)